Raymond Ehrlich (February 2, 1918 – July 12, 2005) was a justice of the Florida Supreme Court.

He was a judge from the U.S. state of Florida.  Ehrlich served as a Florida Supreme Court justice from 1981 to 1990.  From 1988 to 1990 he served as chief justice.

Ehrlich graduated from the University of Florida with his bachelor's degree in 1939, where he was a member of the Pi Lambda Phi fraternity.  He received his law degree from the University of Florida as well in 1942. In addition, Ehrlich was a member of Florida Blue Key and he served in the U.S. Navy during World War II.

References

External links
Justice Ehrlich's memorial
Raymond Ehrlich's Bio
Info about Ehrlich

1918 births
2005 deaths
University of Florida alumni
Chief Justices of the Florida Supreme Court
20th-century American judges
Justices of the Florida Supreme Court
Fredric G. Levin College of Law alumni
United States Navy personnel of World War II